Clappia is the scientific name of two genera of organisms and may refer to:
Clappia (gastropod), a genus of snails in the family Lithoglyphidae
Clappia (plant), a genus of plants in the family Asteraceae